Tracy House is a Frank Lloyd Wright-designed house in Normandy Park, Washington.

Tracy House may also refer to:

Tracy Inn, Tracy, California, listed on the NRHP in San Joaquin County, California
Tracy-Causer Block, Portland, Maine, listed on the National Register of Historic Places in Portland, Maine
Tracy Farm, Orleans, New York, listed on the NRHP in Jefferson County, New York
Purdum-Tracy House, Portsmouth, Ohio, listed on the NRHP in Scioto County, Ohio
Lee Tracy House, Shelburne, Vermont, listed on the National Register of Historic Places in Chittenden County, Vermont